Rahasya Rathri is a 1980 Indian Kannada-language film, directed by M. S. Kumar and produced by R. N. Brothers. The film stars Vishnuvardhan, Bharathi, Prakash and Radha Ravi. The film has musical score by Shankar–Ganesh.

Cast

Vishnuvardhan
Bharathi
Padmapriya
Jayamalini 
Jyothi Lakshmi 
Halam as Rama
Narasimharaju
Balakrishna 
Dinesh 
B. Jaya

Soundtrack
The music was composed by Shankar–Ganesh.

References

External links
 
 

1980 films
1980 horror films
Indian vampire films
1980s Kannada-language films
Films scored by Shankar–Ganesh